Ganassi may refer to:

People
 Silvestro Ganassi dal Fontego (1492–1565), author of Opera intitulata Fontegara (Venice, 1535) and Regola Rubertina (Venice, 1542)
 Chip Ganassi (b. 1958), American businessman and former auto racing driver
 Sonia Ganassi (b. 1966), Italian mezzo-soprano

Other
 Chip Ganassi Racing, an automotive racing organization founded and owned by Chip Ganassi
 A Ganassi recorder, constructed according to the fingering charts given by Silvestro Ganassi
 Ganassi, Lanao del Sur, a municipality in the Philippines